L'Estrange is a surname of French origin which may refer to any of the following people or characters.

People

L'Estrange
 Alexander L'Estrange (born 1974), English composer and jazz musician
 Charles James L'Estrange (1867–1947), children's fiction author who used the pen name Herbert Strang along with George Herbert Ely (1866–1958)
 Francis L'Estrange (c. 1756–1836), Irish surgeon, President of the Royal College of Surgeons in Ireland
 Gerry L'Estrange (1917–1996), Irish politician
 Heath L'Estrange (born 1985), Australian rugby league player
 Henri L'Estrange (c. 1842–c. 1900), Australian tightrope walker and balloonist
 Herbert L'Estrange Ewen (1876–1912), British philatelist
 Michael L'Estrange (born 1952), Australian academic and former public servant
 Nicholas L'Estrange (1511–1580), English Member of Parliament
 Peter L'Estrange, 20th-century Australian Jesuit priest
 Richard L'Estrange (1500s), English Member of Parliament
 Roger L'Estrange (1616–1704), English pamphleteer and author
 Sean L'Estrange (born 1967), Australian politician

Lestrange or de Lestrange
 Augustin de Lestrange (1754–1827), French Trappist
 Gisèle Lestrange (1927–1991), French graphic artist
 John Lestrange (died 1269), English landowner, administrator and soldier

Le Strange or le Strange
 some early bearers of the English title Baron Strange, including:
 Eubulus le Strange, 1st Baron Strange (died 1335), an especially competent and trusted military officer for King Edward III
 some early bearers of the English title Baron Strange of Blackmere, including:
 Fulk le Strange, 1st Baron Strange of Blackmere (died 1324)
 Guy Le Strange (1854–1933), English orientalist
 Hamon le Strange (1583–1654), English politician
 Sir Thomas Le Strange (1494–1545), an Esquire of the Body to Henry VIII

Fictional characters
 Bellatrix Lestrange, in the Harry Potter series
 Gary Le Strange, created by comedian Waen Shepherd
 Leta Lestrange, a fictional witch in the Wizarding World
 Estelle Lestrange, a fictional character in The Murder at the Vicarage by Agatha Christie